Antoni Łangowski (born 19 April 1990) is a Polish handball player for Gwardia Opole and the Polish national team.

Career
He made his debut for the national team on 4 June 2013, in a friendly match against Sweden (27:29), where he scored two goals. He was also chosen to participate at the 2013 World Championship in Spain, but failed to make it to the final squad.

He represented Poland at the 2020 European Men's Handball Championship.

References

External links

1990 births
Living people
Polish male handball players
People from Chojnice County